Macrogradungula is a monotypic genus of Australian large-clawed spiders containing the single species, Macrogradungula moonya. It was first described by Raymond Robert Forster, Norman I. Platnick & Michael R. Gray in 1987, and has only been found in Australia. It is classified under the family Gradungulidae, superfamily Austrochiloidea, and suborder Araneomorphae.

Distribution
Macrogradungula moonya is currently known from three disjunct localities in northeastern Queensland, Australia. The first specimens were recovered from rainforest sink holes in Boulder Creek, Walter Hill Range. Other specimens were reported from caves and cavities among boulder fields in the mountains of the Kalkajaka National Park and Mount Bartle Frere. It is unknown if these other populations may represent new species.

References

Gradungulidae
Monotypic Araneomorphae genera
Spiders of Australia
Taxa named by Raymond Robert Forster